Group A of the 2016 Fed Cup Europe/Africa Zone Group II was one of two pools in the Europe/Africa zone of the 2016 Fed Cup. Three teams competed in a round robin competition, with the top team and the bottom team proceeding to their respective sections of the play-offs: the top team played for advancement to Group I, while the bottom team faced potential relegation to Group III.

Standings

Round-robin

Lithuania vs. Denmark

Finland vs. Denmark

Finland vs. Lithuania

External links 
 Fed Cup website

A2